Empis cuneipennis is a species of fly in the family Empididae. It is included in the subgenus Lissempis of the genus Empis. It is found in the  Palearctic.

References

Empis
Asilomorph flies of Europe
Taxa named by Mario Bezzi
Insects described in 1899